Luís Morton Barreto Murat was a Brazilian journalist, poet, philosopher and politician. He was born in Itaguaí on 4 May 1861 and died in Rio de Janeiro on 3 July 1929. He was a founding member of the Academia Brasileira and was the first occupant of Chair 1. He was succeeded in the position by Afonso d'E. Taunay.

References

Brazilian writers
People from Itaguaí
1861 births
1929 deaths